Osman Can Çötür (born 13 September 2001) is a Turkish professional footballer who plays as a defender for an amateur side Talasgücü Belediyespor.

Professional career
Çötür made his professional debut for Kayserispor in a 6–2 Süper Lig loss to Trabzonspor on 28 December 2019.

References

External links
 
 

2001 births
People from Sorgun, Yozgat
Sportspeople from Yozgat
Living people
Turkish footballers
Association football midfielders
Kayserispor footballers
Süper Lig players
TFF Third League players